The TV Dinner Hour is an American sketch comedy review written by Richard O’Donnell, directed by Amy McKenzie, and performed by the New Age Vaudeville theater company in Chicago.

History

Glidden Lodge resort
The TV Dinner Hour, has a book, music, and lyrics by Richard O'Donnell. In the summer of 1986, it was originally produced and staged by Amy McKenzie, and featured the New Age Vaudeville comedy troupe at the Glidden Lodge resort in Baileys Harbor, Wisconsin.

Chicago, CrossCurrents
On March 10, 1987, It officially premiered at the CrossCurrents' cabaret theater, 3206 N. Wilton St., Chicago, Illinois.

The TV Dinner Hour was one of the cult hits of the Chicago comedy boom of the 1980s.

Production

Principal creative team

The TV Dinner Hour was performed by the New Age Vaudeville Theater Co., members of Actor’s Equity Association (AEA). The set, props and videos were shot by NAV production designer Peter Neville, and produced by McKenzie and O'Donnell.

Kogan reviews

The TV Dinner Hour had a successful run and was praised by Rick Kogan of the Chicago Tribune as "...a great show, uproariously funny and searingly intelligent." He went on to write that New Age Vaudeville's talent was in presenting "...such TV fare as game shows, rock videos, sitcoms, kiddie shows, religious programs, and horror movies [that were] transformed into fodder for devilish fun."

Kogan continued, stating, "Improv guru Del Close had a spectacular running routine as the Rev. Thing of the First Generic Church of What's-His-Name". He also hailed the production as "Marvelously written by Richard O`Donnell and snappily directed by Amy McKenzie," and praising the ensemble, writing, "The TV Dinner hour included bravura comic acting by Megan Cavanagh, Bobby McGuire, Todd Erickson, O`Donnell and newcomers to New Age Vaudeville, Michael Dempsey and Lisa Keefe."

In conclusion, Kogan surmised that both productions, An Evening with Elmore & Gwendolyn Putts and The TV Dinner Hour (running concurrently), were, "Among the most polished and clever productions of the season, a pair of devilishly inventive and challenging shows that won over critics and audiences."

Cast

Wisconsin
(+denotes member of A.E.A.)
 Megan Cavanagh+
 Todd Erickson
 Dennis Kennedy+
 Amy McKenzie+
 Bobby McGuire 
 Richard O’Donnell+

Chicago
(+denotes member of A.E.A.)
 Megan Cavanagh+
 Del Close+
 Michael Dempsey
 Todd Erickson
 Lisa Keefe
 Bobby McGuire 
 Richard O’Donnell+

References 

American comedy troupes
1987 plays
Sketch comedy troupes
Comedy plays